Martin Wagner (born 24 February 1968) is a German former footballer who played as a midfielder or defender. He is currently running the player agency MaWa Consult.

Career 
He played over 300 league matches in the first and second division of the German league pyramid. Two of his six caps for Germany Wagner won during the 1994 World Cup in the knockout stage.

Honours

Club 
1. FC Kaiserslautern
 Bundesliga: 1997–98
 DFB-Pokal: 1995–96
 2. Bundesliga: 1996–97

References

External links 
 Website of Wagner's player agency
 
 
 

German footballers
Germany international footballers
1994 FIFA World Cup players
Bundesliga players
2. Bundesliga players
1. FC Nürnberg players
1. FC Kaiserslautern players
VfL Wolfsburg players
People from Offenburg
Sportspeople from Freiburg (region)
1968 births
Living people
Association football midfielders
Footballers from Baden-Württemberg
West German footballers